Spencer Gifts LLC, doing business as Spencer's, is a North American mall retailer with over 600 stores in the United States and Canada. Its stores specialize in novelty and gag gifts, and also sell clothing, band merchandise, sex toys, room decor, collectible figures, fashion and body jewelry, fantasy and horror items. The company also owns and operates a pop-up seasonal retailer, Spirit Halloween.

History
Spencer Gifts was founded in 1947 in Easton, Pennsylvania by Max Spencer Adler as a mail-order catalog that sold an assortment of novelty merchandise. In 1960, Max's brother Harry Adler, who had been with the company since 1947, sold his shares and left.

In 1963, Spencer Gifts opened its first retail store in the Cherry Hill Mall in Cherry Hill, New Jersey, where it operates to this day.

After opening approximately 450 stores under the name Spencer Gifts, Adler sold Spencer Gifts to entertainment conglomerate MCA in 1967. In 2003, Spencer's Gifts was completely rebranded after being put under new management, and with the change become known as just Spencer's.

In 1990, Spencer Gifts closed its mail-order catalog division.

In 1993 and 1996, respectively, Spencer Gifts acquired the DAPY line of stores and opened its first GLOW! store. The DAPY and GLOW! trademarks were retired sometime before 2007. As of 2021, both GLOW! And DAPY have returned to business under a private entity.  

In 1995, MCA was acquired by Seagram Company Ltd. and was renamed Universal Studios. Spencer Gifts began to operate Universal Studios stores as a subsidiary of its parent company.

In 1997, Spencer Gifts opened its first store in Canada.

In 1999, Spencer's acquired Spirit Halloween, a seasonal retailer that was founded by Joseph Marver in 1983. At that time, the business had 60 temporary locations. Spirit's stores are only open for the two months leading up to Halloween, though it maintains a website year-round. The stores are generally operated out of the spaces of recently vacated businesses. As of 2013, Spirit had over 1,000 locations, which comprised about half of Spencer's annual revenue of $250 million.

In 2000, Spencer's expanded into the United Kingdom. The chain opened up to 14 stores in the United Kingdom before closing them sometime in the mid-2000s.

In 2001, Vivendi acquired Universal Studios and rebranded the entire organization as Vivendi Universal Entertainment.  Less than two years later, in 2003, GB Palladin, a joint venture between Gordon Brothers Group and Palladin Capital Group, acquired Spencer Gifts from Vivendi, around the same time that Vivendi was preparing to sell majority of the shares of Universal Studios to General Electric's NBC division. As a result of the sale, Steven Silverstein became Spencer Gifts' CEO and also the CEO and president of Spirit Halloween.

In the fall of 2004, Spencer's began redesigning its stores.

In 2006, Spencer's began its "Spirit of Children" program, which raises donations through its Spirit Halloween stores for, and hosts Halloween parties in, children's hospitals in Canada and the United States. Since 2007, the program has raised over $16 million for over 130 children's hospitals.

ACON Investments acquired the company in 2007 and sold it to Spencer's management in 2015.

Legal issues
The company has been investigated by the Federal Trade Commission (FTC) for its advertising practices.

In 1962, Spencer Gifts was found by the Federal Trade Commission to have violated the Federal Trade Commission Act by making misleading statements in advertising its "Reduce-Eze" girdles and ordered to cease making false claims. The girdles were advertised with statements such as "Slim 4 Inches Without Diet" and "Trims 4 Inches Off Your Figure".

In 1969, Spencer Gifts was found by the FTC to, through the use of words like "stone", "birthstone", and "gold", have misrepresented its jewelry products. As its jewelry did not contain any "genuine precious or semiprecious stones", nor was its metal 24 karat gold, Spencer Gifts was ordered to stop use of deceptive statements in the promotion of its jewelry.

In 1970, Spencer Gifts was found by the FTC to have misled its customers as to the efficacy of its "non-prescription magnifying spectacles" by failing to disclose that correction of vision defects is limited to older persons who do not have any eye diseases, like astigmatism, but only need "simple magnifying or reducing lenses". The FTC ordered the retailer to cease the use of advertisements that misrepresented the quality of its optical products.

Controversies
Spencer Gifts has come under fire for its merchandise, which has been considered to be sexually explicit and racist.

In 1989, the American-Arab Anti-Discrimination Committee (ADC) mailed thousands of pamphlets to Arab-Americans across the United States to campaign against Spencer's 'sheik' and 'Arafat' Halloween masks, which were marketed as part of its "Fright Stuff" line of products. The pamphlet featured a picture of the 'sheik' mask and claimed that it "was the only ethnic one in the product line and being marketed alongside traditional monster masks reinforced the notion Arab people are scary." Spencer Gifts pulled the two masks from its stores in October following a "three-day protest and telephone campaign" by the ADC, but decided later that month to place the masks back on sale, prompting the ADC to boycott and picket Spencer's stores. In a letter to ADC spokesperson Faris Bouhafa, Spencer's general counsel Ronald Mangel said that "after re-reviewing the 'Sheik' and 'Arafat' masks and discussing the look of the masks with others", Spencer's president John Hacala decided to reverse the earlier decision and place the masks back in stores. "We will not reorder the masks for next year," the letter added.

Spencer Gifts has been criticized for allowing children access to adult toys and other explicit products. While adults-only products are ostensibly kept in areas off-limits to children, there have been several instances where that is not the case. In one instance, police seized adult materials from the Spencer Gifts in Rapid City, South Dakota as "possible evidence for the national retailer's failure to register as an adult-oriented business".

In February 2014, the Ancient Order of Hibernians, the largest Irish organization in the United States, called on Spencer's to cease the sale of merchandise it felt propagated stereotypes about Irish Americans, such as a T-shirt with the slogan "F*** me I'm Irish" and a hat sporting the phrase "Irish Girl Wasted". AOH National Anti-Defamation Chairman Neil Cosgrove protested, "We note that Spencer's Gifts is a recidivist when it comes to denigrating the heritage and culture of Irish Americans. Spencer's St. Pat's merchandise seems to plumb new lows with each year."

References

External links

1947 establishments in New Jersey
1967 mergers and acquisitions
2003 mergers and acquisitions
2007 mergers and acquisitions
Companies based in Atlantic County, New Jersey
Egg Harbor Township, New Jersey
Novelty items
Retail companies established in 1947
Retail companies of the United States